Almamy Suluku (1820 - 1906) was a Limba ruler from Sierra Leone who maintained his independence as long as possible through political strategy.

Early life
Almamy Suluku was born in 1820 in Kamabai, Biriwa country, in the Northern Province of Sierra Leone. He was the son of Sankailay, a great Limba chief of the Biriwa country, with its capital of Bumban. As a young man, Suluku became the war captain, and under his military leadership, Biriwa became one of the largest kingdoms in Sierra Leone. When his father died, Suluku replaced him as the chief of Biriwa.

Political strategy
But Suluku was not satisfied with territory alone, and he set out to make his kingdom wealthy as well. He fostered the trade in gold, ivory, hides, and foodstuffs that passed through Bumban on the way  to Freetown, and he gave effective police protection to the traders in his realm. His progressive rule impressed the British administration in Freetown, which sent him annual gifts throughout the 1880s. When Samori Toure's Mandinka forces occupied Biriwa in 1884, Suluku pretended to co-operate with the Mandinka, while sending urgent messages to the British in Freetown warning of a disruption in trade. The British accepted Suluku's arguments, persuading the Mandinka to leave Biriwa country. Thus, while other Sierra Leonean kings suffered costly defeats in futile military resistance, Suluku managed to have his way through political strategy alone.

In the 1890s, as British power increased, Suluku pursued his own independent policy while making the British believe he was their loyal ally. He sent frequent messages of friendship to the British Governor and entertained royally every British delegation that arrived in Bumban, but did exactly as he pleased. Some lower ranking officers warned of Suluku's deception, but Freetown was convinced of his loyalty. When the 1898 Rebellion led by Bai Bureh broke out, Suluku sent warriors and weapons to Bai Bureh, but when the British complained, he sent them a letter expressing his support for their position and offering his services as mediator. After the Protectorate was established, the British wanted to break up Suluku's kingdom into small chiefdoms,  but Suluku's subjects refused to cooperate as long as the old Gbaku was still alive. When he was very aged, a British official asked Suluku to name his successor under the new and tightly controlled colonial structure. The old Gbaku's reply: "Suluku will never die".

King Almammy and Captain Tomba, like many Africans loathed the whole business of the European slave trade and forbade their subjects to take part in it.

References
https://web.archive.org/web/20090526015329/http://sierra-leone.org/heroes5.html

Before the Mayflower a history of the negro in America, 1619 - 1962 , LeRone Bennett Jr

Hut Tax War of 1898
1820 births
1906 deaths
People from Bombali District